Gwen Taylor (born 19 February 1939) is an English actress who has appeared in many British television programmes. She is known for her roles as Amy Pearce in the sitcom Duty Free (1984–1986); Barbara Liversidge in the sitcom Barbara (1999–2003); Peggy Armstrong in the drama series Heartbeat (2005–2009), Anne Foster in the long-running ITV soap opera Coronation Street (2011–2012), and Vi Highway in BBC One soap opera EastEnders (2021–2023). She was nominated for the 1990 BAFTA TV Award for Best Actress for her role as Rita Simcock in the comedy series A Bit of a Do (1989). Her film appearances include Monty Python's Life of Brian (1979) and The Lady in the Van (2015).

Biography
Taylor was born in Crich, Derbyshire. Her initial career was in banking, but when she was an assistant area manager for the National Provincial Bank in Derby she became increasingly interested in amateur dramatics. Her first professional acting role was as a Green Bean in 'Jack and the Beanstalk' at the Derby Playhouse. Taylor trained at East 15 Acting School, London. In 1973 she played Pamela Dean, the sister of the murder victim Victor Dean, in 
Murder Must Advertise, an adaptation of Dorothy L Sayers novel. In 1975 she played the role of Jack Regan’s girlfriend, a probation officer named Anne Knightley in fourth episode of the second series of the British police drama, The Sweeney: episode Big Brother.

Later in the 1970s, she was one of the regulars on Eric Idle's Rutland Weekend Television. She also appeared in other Monty Python spin-offs such as The Life of Brian and Ripping Yarns, and in a dual role as both Chastity and Mrs. Iris Mountbatten in the Beatles parody All You Need Is Cash. On the film's DVD commentary Eric Idle described her as 'the best comedy actress I ever worked with. She could do anything'. However, she turned down a role in The Meaning of Life as she thought that being covered in intestines as a man exploded in a restaurant would be "tasteless".

In 1990, she was nominated for a BAFTA as "Best Actress" for her role in A Bit of a Do opposite Sir David Jason. Between 2005 and 2009, she played the role of Peggy Armstrong in the drama Heartbeat. In July 2011, it was announced that Taylor would be joining the cast of Coronation Street, playing Anne Foster, the mother of the villainous Frank Foster (Andrew Lancel). She departed the series after her character was revealed as the killer of her rapist son on 19 March 2012. In November 2012, she appeared with Don Warrington in the stage version of Driving Miss Daisy on a UK-wide tour. Taylor played various roles in Tracey Ullman's Show on the BBC in 2016 and 2017, and played Lillian in an episode of the Sky 1 sitcom Trollied in 2018. In May 2021, she joined the cast of BBC soap opera EastEnders playing Vi Highway.

Selected filmography

Awards and nominations

References

External links
 
 
 

1939 births
Actresses from Derbyshire
Alumni of East 15 Acting School
English film actresses
English soap opera actresses
English television actresses
Living people

People from Derby
20th-century English actresses
21st-century English actresses